The 2006–07 Argentine Torneo Argentino A was the twelfth season of third division professional football in Argentina. A total of 24 teams competed; the champion was promoted to Primera B Nacional.

Club information

Zone A

Zone B

Zone C

Apertura 2006

Zone A

Zone B

Zone C

Final stage

Note: The team in the first line plays at home the second leg.

Clausura 2007

Zone A

Zone B

Zone C

Final stage

Note: The team in the first line plays at home the second leg.

Overall standings

Zone A

Zone B

Zone C

Championship final
The Final was played between the Apertura winners, Desamparados and clausura winners, Guillermo Brown. But as Desamparados had to play the Relegation Playoff, so Independiente Rivadavia, as best team in the overall standings took their place.

Promotion/relegation playoff B Nacional-Torneo Argentino A

Ben Hur remained in the Primera B Nacional by winning the playoff.

Relegation playoff

|-
!colspan="5"|Relegation/promotion playoff 1

|-
!colspan="5"|Relegation/promotion playoff 2

|-
!colspan="5"|Relegation/promotion playoff 3

Juventud (P) remained in the Torneo Argentino A by winning the playoff.
Talleres (P) remained in the Torneo Argentino A by winning the playoff.
Desamparados remained in the Torneo Argentino A after a 2-2 aggregate tie by virtue of a "sports advantage". In case of a tie in goals, the team from the Torneo Argentino A gets to stay in it.

Match Fixing Scandal

This season was marred by two match-fixing scandal, which altered the normal course of the competition.

The first involved Central Norte and 9 de Julio (R), they had to play in the round 14 of Torneo Clausura 2007. Central Norte was already relegated to the Torneo Argentino B because of the victory of Talleres (P) and gives intentionally a penalty to 9 de Julio (R) in the last moments of the match, allowing them to qualify for the Final Stage and avoiding in the same way the qualification of Juventud Antoniana, the city rival of Central Norte. The match finished 0-1 because of the penalty, but after this, in the TV it was found that both Managers were talking in the middle of the match. The Consejo Federal decided to give the match as a defeat for both teams 0-1, replaced Juventud Antoniana for 9 de Julio (R) in the Final Stage, suspended both Managers and the Referee and deducted 6 points to both teams (Central Norte and 9 de Julio (R)) for the next season.

3 days after, in a match between Desamparados and San Martín (M) something similar happened. For Desamparados, Champion of Torneo Apertura, a defeat meant, due to their very bad performance in the Torneo Clausura, that they had to play the Relegation Playoff, losing the possibility of playing to get promoted to Primera B Nacional, and Independiente Rivadavia would take their place (cty rival of San Martín (M)). San Martin (M), meanwhile, with a draw avoided the Relegation Playoff, so the draw benefited both teams: Desamparados would avoid the Relegation Playoff and would play the Final to get promoted, and San Martín would avoid also the Relegation Playoff and would prevent their city rival, Independiente Rivadavia to play the Final to get Promoted. The most disadvantaged was Juventud Unida Universitario because they had to play the Relegation Playoff. The match ended 0-0. Days after Juventud Unida Universitario filed a complaint and a video showing that a player from San Martín (M) was admitting that Desamparados offered them an incentive of $30.000. The Consejo Federal decided to give the match as a defeat for both teams 0-1 and deducted 9 points to both teams so San Martín (M) was relegated to the Torneo Argentino B and Desamparados had to play the Relegation Playoff (this benefited Gimnasia y Esgrima (Mza) and Juventud Unida Universitario, who were displaced of the last places of the table. Thus Independiente Rivadavia played the Final to get promoted.

See also
2006–07 in Argentine football

References

Torneo Argentino A seasons
3